The Falabella is an Argentine breed of small horse. It is among the smallest of horse breeds, with a height at the withers in the range ..

History
The ancestral stock of the horse of South America descended from horses brought to the western hemisphere by the Spanish of Andalusian and other Iberian bloodlines. In the southern part of the continent, significant numbers of these horses developed within geographically isolated conditions and by the mid-19th century, there were any number of smaller, inbred animals in the herds of Mapuche of southern Buenos Aires province in Olavarría, Argentina.  The Falabella horse was originally developed in Argentina from local horses of Criollo stock, beginning in 1868 with the breeding program of Patrick Newtall. When Newtall died, the herd and breeding methods were passed to Newtall's son-in-law, Juan Falabella. Juan added additional bloodlines, including the Welsh Pony, Shetland pony, and small Thoroughbreds. With considerable inbreeding, he was able to gain consistently small size within the herd.

Characteristics

The breed is proportioned similarly to horses, other than in size. They are similar to Thoroughbreds or Arabs in their conformation, with a sleek coat and a slim frame. The Falabella’s body is small and compact. The breed also inherited some cob-like features from pony bloodlines, including sturdy bone, and a thicker hair coat, particularly the mane, tail and around the fetlocks. The head may be slightly larger and the neck is often stouter by comparison with a normal-sized horse, but overall, the animal is not unusually or abnormally proportioned.

Bay (or a variant of bay, called "brown") and black are the most common colors, but there are also pintos, palominos and other spotting patterns found. Black or red leopard-spotted Falabellas (resembling, but not the same as the Appaloosa horse breed) also exist, but are not common.

They are considered very hardy and consistently pass on size, conformation and temperament.

Use 
The Falabella is kept as a pet or for show. It can be ridden by small children, or trained to pull a small cart.

References 

Horse breeds originating in Argentina
Horse breeds